Philippa Anne Coulthard is an Australian television actress, best known for playing Jorjie in the Doctor Who spin-off series K-9, lead character Amber Mitchell in Lightning Point, and Helen Schlegel in the BBC production of Howards End.

Started performing on a stage in 1996, when she was four, taking dance classes at Promenade Dance School.

Filmography

References

External links 

1992 births
Actresses from Dallas
Australian film actresses
Australian television actresses
Living people
21st-century Australian actresses
21st-century American women